Chad Albert Larson (born October 27, 1965) is an American musician, best known as the co-founder and bass guitarist for the Orange County rock band The Aquabats, in which he performs under the stage name and persona of Crash McLarson. From 2012 to 2014, Larson also played Crash McLarson on The Hub original series The Aquabats! Super Show! and on the series' 2019 YouTube-based revival The Aquabats! RadVentures!.

Biography
Larson has been a member of The Aquabats since the group's inception, having co-founded the band alongside Christian Jacobs and Boyd Terry in 1994. In the earliest days of the band, Larson played trombone before switching to bass guitar. Since then, he's acted as one of The Aquabats' most prominent songwriters, writing or co-writing a majority of the band's material. On The Aquabats! Super Show!, Larson worked as an occasional composer alongside his other bandmates in addition to his co-starring role, as well as contributing screenwriting credits, most prominently on the 2013 episode "The Shark Fighter!".

In the early 1990s and up until their break-up in 1997, Larson was also the bassist for the hardcore punk band B.H.R., an acronym whose meaning regularly changed. In 1999, Larson performed anonymously with other members of The Aquabats in the side project The Sandfleas, where he played guitar under the stage name "Breath".

Outside of The Aquabats, Larson makes a career as a professional electrician. He currently lives in Huntington Beach, California with his wife and four children, and, like bandmates Jacobs and Ian Fowles, is a member of the Church of Jesus Christ of Latter-day Saints.

Discography

The Aquabats
See The Aquabats discography for a full list of recordingsThe Return of the Aquabats (1996) - bassThe Fury of the Aquabats! (1997) - bass, organ, vocalsThe Aquabats vs. the Floating Eye of Death! (1999) - bass, vocalsMyths, Legends and Other Amazing Adventures, Vol. 2 (2000) - bass guitarYo! Check Out This Ride! EP (2004) - bass guitarCharge!! (2005) - bass, vocalsRadio Down! (2010) - bass, backing vocalsHi-Five Soup! (2011) - bass, vocalsThe Aquabats! Super Show! Television Soundtrack: Volume One (2019) - bass, vocalsKooky Spooky...In Stereo (2020) - bass, vocals

B.H.R.Breaking In! (1993)Guttermouth/B.H.R. 7" split (1993)

The SandfleasFour Songs Four Jerks'' (1999) - guitar

References

External links

Tastes Like Chicken interview with Crash McLarson
Spendid e-zine interview with Crash McLarson

Living people
Latter Day Saints from California
American punk rock bass guitarists
American rock bass guitarists
American male bass guitarists
American male television actors
The Aquabats members
1965 births
American male guitarists
20th-century American guitarists